Bayan Baru is a town in the Malaysian state of Penang. It is located within the Southwest Penang Island District, adjacent to the Bayan Lepas Free Industrial Zone.

The township was created in the 1970s following the establishment of the zone. Since then, Bayan Baru has evolved into a booming neighbourhood, with various commercial and retail developments.

History 
Bayan Baru was first developed by the Penang Development Corporation (PDC) in 1972, in tandem with the construction of the Bayan Lepas Free Industrial Zone. The creation of the new township was aimed at providing a housing area adjacent to the newly built industries in Bayan Lepas, and erasing social and economic inequalities between the urban and rural inhabitants. The first residential developments in the area were in the form of landed properties, such as terraced houses and semi-detached houses.

Transportation 

The main road within Bayan Baru is Jalan Sultan Azlan Shah, which forms part of the Gelugor Highway. The thoroughfare cuts through the neighbourhood, linking the southern George Town suburb of Gelugor to the north with Bayan Lepas to the south.

Several Rapid Penang bus routes serve the area, including 102, 302, 303, 304, 305, 306, 307, 308, 401, 401E and AT (Airport Transit). These routes connect the township with Penang's capital city, George Town, to the north, as well as various parts of Penang Island, such as the Penang International Airport, Batu Maung, Sungai Nibong and Gertak Sanggul. These routes are complemented by Rapid Penang's Congestion Alleviation Transport (CAT), a free-of-charge transit service within Bayan Baru.

In addition, Rapid Penang's cross-strait BEST shuttle services, BEST A and BEST B, are available for employees transiting between Bayan Baru and Seberang Perai on the mainland.

In 2017, LinkBike, a public bicycle sharing service based in George Town, launched its southernmost station at Queensbay Mall, thus providing bikers with an alternative mode of transportation to the capital city.

Education 
There are two primary schools and two high schools within Bayan Baru.

Primary schools
 SRK Bayan Baru
 SRK Seri Permai
High school
 SMK Raja Tun Uda
 Heng Ee High School (Bayan Baru Branch, Sungai Tiram)

Health care 
The 190-bed Pantai Hospital is the sole hospital within Bayan Baru. The private hospital, established in 1997, is now managed under Parkway Pantai's group of hospitals and offers specialist treatments for a variety of medical conditions.

Sports 

Completed in 2000, the SPICE Arena is one of the major sports venues in Penang, capable of hosting various indoor sports events, including squash, badminton and martial arts. It has also emerged as the preferred venue within Penang for meetings, incentives, conferences and exhibitions (MICE). The SPICE Arena was recently renovated and is now complemented in its role as a MICE venue by the GBI-certified SPICE Convention & Exhibition Centre, the world's first hybrid solar-powered convention centre.

Adjacent to the SPICE Arena, the SPICE Aquatics Centre not only serves as a venue for national and international aquatic sports events such as swimming and diving, it is also put to use as a community swimming facility when not in use for tournaments.

Shopping 

A number of shopping centres have been built within Bayan Baru to cater for a relatively sizable catchment area, including shoppers from the surrounding areas such as Bayan Lepas, Batu Maung and Sungai Nibong.
 Sunshine Square
 Giant Bayan Baru Hypermarket
 D'Piazza Mall
 One Precinct
 Mayang Mall (to be redeveloped as GBS@Mayang)
Aside from these shopping centres within Bayan Baru proper, Queensbay Mall, the largest shopping mall in Penang, is situated nearby and serves the neighbourhood as well. The mall contains a variety of international brands, a cinema and various other entertainment options.

Infrastructure 
In recent years, the Penang state government has allocated a significant amount of investments to turn Bayan Baru into a centre for Business Processing Outsourcing (BPO). This includes the construction of Multimedia Super Corridor (MSC)-status buildings, such as SUNTECH Tower and One Precinct. In addition, the existing Mayang Mall will also be converted into a Global Business Services (GBS) centre, known as GBS@Mayang, by 2018. Indicative of Bayan Baru's potential as a centre for business services and outsourcing, Celestica, a Canadian multinational electronics firm, opened its GBS centre within One Precinct in 2016, thus joining a list of international firms already in Bayan Baru such as Keyence and Zurich Insurance.

The creation of office space in Bayan Baru will also be supplemented by commercial developments within the neighbourhood, such as the Penang International Commercial City and Quartermile.

See also 
 Bayan Lepas

References

Neighbourhoods in George Town, Penang
Southwest Penang Island District